CKKE-FM is a First Nations community radio station that operates at 89.9 FM in Mingan, Quebec, Canada.

The station originally began broadcasting in March 1980 at 90.1 FM until it received CRTC approval to move to its current frequency in 1991.

CKKE is owned by Corporation de Radio montagnaise de Mingan.

References

External links

Kke